Frank Tutvin (born August 23, 1945) is a Canadian-American former professional tennis player.

Born in Montreal, Tutvin represented the United States at junior Davis Cup level, having lived with his parents in Florida for several years. He played collegiate tennis for the University of Miami.

Tutvin reached the singles third round of the 1967 Wimbledon Championships, competing as a Canadian.

Outside of professional tennis he worked as a teaching pro at the Palm Bay Club in Miami.

References

External links
 
 

1945 births
Living people
American male tennis players
Canadian male tennis players
Miami Hurricanes men's tennis players
Tennis players from Montreal